Bernadeta is  female given name in France, Poland, Lithuania; female form of the name Bernard.

Bernadeta Maria Bocek-Piotrowska (born  1970),  Polish former cross country skier 
Bernadeta Gaspà Bringueret (born  1955), Andorran politician
Bernadeta Sobiróus (1844–1879), firstborn daughter of a miller from Lourdes (France),  venerated as a Christian mystic and Saint in the Catholic Church

Feminine given names